Phyllonorycter populifoliella is a moth of the family Gracillariidae. It is known from all of Europe, except the British Isles.

Adults are on wing in two generations per year, from April to May and in again from August to September.

The larvae feed on Populus x canadensis, Populus deltoides, Populus euramericana and Populus nigra. They mine the leaves of their host plant. They create a lower surface tentiform mine, without a fold. Pupation takes place in a round cocoon within the mine. The frass is deposited in a corner of the mine. The pupa of the second generation hibernates.

References

External links
Lepiforum.de

populifoliella
Moths of Europe
Moths described in 1833